Mariana Machado Valadão (born 3 July 1984) is a Brazilian Christian singer, songwriter, worship pastor and television presenter.

Biography 
Mariana Valadão is the daughter of Pastor Márcio Valadão and Renata Valadão, pastors and founders of the Lagoinha Baptist Church. Mariana is the youngest sister of André Valadão and Ana Paula Valadão.

She was part of the worship ministry Diante do Trono, led by her sister Ana Paula Valadão.

Her first solo album was "Mariana Valadão", recorded in 2008.

Discography 

 Solo career

Video Albums

 with Diante do Trono
 Águas Purificadoras – as member (2000)
 Aclame ao Senhor – as member (2000)
 Preciso de Ti – as member (2001)
 Brasil Diante do Trono – as member (2002)
 Nos Braços do Pai – as member (2002)
 Quero Me Apaixonar – as member (2003)
 Esperança – as member (2004)
 Ainda Existe Uma Cruz – as member (2005)
 Por Amor de Ti, Oh Brasil – as member (2006)
 In the Father's Arms – as member (2006)
 En los Brazos del Padre – as member (2006)
 Tempo de Festa – as member (2007)
 Príncipe da Paz – as member (2007)
 Com Intensidade – as member (2008)
 A Canção do Amor – as member (2008)
 Tua Visão – as special participant (2009)
 Sol da Justiça – as special participant (2011)
 Glória a Deus – as special participant (2012)
 Creio – as special participant (2012)
 Global Project: Português – as special participant (2012)
 Tu Reinas – as special participant (2014)
 Deus Reina – as special participant (2015)

References

External links
Official website

1984 births
Living people
Brazilian Christian religious leaders
Christian music songwriters
Performers of contemporary worship music
Brazilian gospel singers
Brazilian singer-songwriters
People from Belo Horizonte
People from Minas Gerais
Brazilian Baptists
Brazilian evangelicals
Brazilian television evangelists
21st-century Brazilian singers
21st-century Brazilian women singers
Brazilian women singer-songwriters